Farnerud is a Swedish surname. Notable people with the surname include:

Alexander Farnerud (born 1984), Swedish footballer, brother of Pontus
Pontus Farnerud (born 1980), Swedish footballer

Swedish-language surnames